Vesanto is a municipality of Finland. It is located in the Northern Savonia region.

Neighbour municipalities are Keitele, Konnevesi, Rautalampi, Tervo, Viitasaari and Äänekoski.

The municipality is unilingually Finnish.

Notable people
 Helka Hynninen (1930–2017)
 Kalevi Huuskonen (1932–1999)
 Leena Lehtolainen (born 1964)

References

External links

Municipality of Vesanto – Official website

 
Populated places established in 1871
1871 establishments in Finland